The House of Mihajlo Apostolski is a house in the suburb of Novo Selo, Štip, North Macedonia. The house is the birthhouse of the Macedonian WWII general and statesman Mihajlo Apostolski and the building is registered as a Cultural Heritage of North Macedonia.

Gallery

See also
 House on Krste Misirkov St. no. 12 - a cultural heritage site
 House on Krste Misirkov St. no. 14 - a cultural heritage site
 House on Krste Misirkov St. no. 67 - a cultural heritage site
 House on Krste Misirkov St. no. 69 - a cultural heritage site
 Dormition of the Theotokos Church - the seat of Novo Selo Parish and a cultural heritage site
 Novo Selo School - the building of the former school and the present seat of the Rectorate of the Goce Delčev University. It is also a cultural heritage site
 Ascension of Christ Church - a 14th-century church and a cultural heritage site

References

External links
 Protected Cultural Heritage Project
 Institute and Museum - Štip

Buildings and structures in Štip
Cultural heritage of North Macedonia